Todd Hicks (born November 3, 1974 in Cheverly, Maryland) is a former American soccer left back who played in the National Professional Soccer League, USISL and USL Second Division.  He coaches youth soccer. His is currently a High School Assistant Principal for Carroll County Public Schools and currently lives in Severna Park, Maryland.

Hicks attended Bowie High School where he played on the 1990 and 1991 State High School champion soccer team.
He played several years for the Maryland ODP youth teams and the Region 1 regional team. In 1992, he entered Towson State University, playing on the men's soccer team until 1995. He played and started in every game while at Towson. He earned freshman of the year honors and was selected 1st team All-Big South his junior year and 1st team America East his senior year. He was the all-time leader in assist for a career (28), for a season (12), and in one game (4). In 2012, Hicks was inducted into the Towson University Hall of Fame. 

In 1995, the Baltimore Spirit of the National Professional Soccer League selected Hicks in the NPSL Territorial Draft.  He spent the six seasons with the team.  In his first two seasons, the team used the Spirit name and in the next four they were known as the Baltimore Blast.  In addition to his indoor career, Hicks played outdoor soccer.  In 1996, 1998 and 1999, he spent the summers with the Delaware Wizards of the USISL.  In 1997, he spent time playing in Germany and he played for the Baltimore Bays

References

1974 births
Living people
People from Cheverly, Maryland
American soccer coaches
American soccer players
Baltimore Bays (1993–1998) players
Baltimore Blast (NPSL) players
Baltimore Spirit players
Crystal Palace Baltimore players
Delaware Wizards players
Association football defenders
National Professional Soccer League (1984–2001) players
Soccer players from Maryland
Towson Tigers men's soccer players
USISL Select League players
USL Second Division players
People from Manchester, Maryland